Pseudoludia is a genus of moths in the family Saturniidae first described by Strand in 1911.

Species
Pseudoludia nyungwe Bouyer, 1988
Pseudoludia suavis (Rothschild, 1907)

References

Saturniinae